Vestre Strandgate (Western Beach-street) is a street and a road in Kristiansand, Norway. The road is a part of National Road 471 and starts after Riksvei 9 ends in Kvadraturen.

Vestre Strandgate is a dual path and pavement on both sides of the road. It is one of the busiest roads in the city center of Kristiansand and constantly has traffic during the day and long out over the nights in the weekend.

Kristiansand S and Kristiansand Bus Terminal are both located at Vestre Strandgate. Businesses, restaurants and kiosk/grocery are located on the street. Other faculties are night clubs, hotels and cafés.

Vestre Strandgate is served by two bus stops, Vestre Strandgate pl. A and Vestre Strandgate pl. B. These stops access local city buses to the Grim and Vågsbygd districts while regional and national bus routes go from the bus terminal.

Crossing streets (from north to south):

Tordenskjolds gate
Kristian IVs gate
Henrik Wergelands gate
Skippergata
Gyldeløves gate
Rådhusgata
Tollbodgata
Dronningens gate
Kongens gate
Østre Strandgate

References 

Streets in Kristiansand
Roads in Agder